Malik Rashid Ahmed Khan (Urdu: ملک رشید احمد خان) is a Pakistani Politician and Member of Senate of Pakistan, currently serving as Chairperson- Senate Committee of Overseas Pakistanis and Human Resource Development.

Political career
He belongs to FATA region of Pakistan, and was elected to the Senate of Pakistan in March 2009 on a general seat from FATA as Independent candidate. He is the chairperson of Senate Committee of Overseas Pakistanis and Human Resource Development and member of senate committees of States and Frontier Regions, Federal Education and Professional Training, Kashmir Affairs & Gilgit Baltistan and Select Committee.

See also
 List of Senators of Pakistan
 List of committees of the Senate of Pakistan

References

External links
Senate of Pakistan Official Website

Living people
Members of the Senate of Pakistan
Year of birth missing (living people)